Bradley Lane MacDonald (born March 3, 1966) is an American former ice hockey player.

Playing career
Born in Tulsa to father, former NHL player Lowell MacDonald, MacDonald was a prep star at the University School of Milwaukee, and grew up in Pittsburgh, Pennsylvania. Drafted by the Calgary Flames, MacDonald chose to attend Harvard University, where he graduated with four school scoring records (including career goals), and ranking in the top five in 11 different statistical categories; he studied philosophy under the tutelage of Alexander George.  He was twice named a first-team All-American.

MacDonald was a member of the bronze-medal winning American team at the 1986 World Junior Hockey Championship. He took a year off from Harvard in 1987-88 to play member of the United States' 1988 Winter Olympics team in Calgary. MacDonald would return to Harvard as team captain to win the 1989 Hobey Baker Award, given to the top collegiate ice hockey player, while at Harvard University, and leading the Crimson to the NCAA Championship. After college, he played for HC Lugano is the Swiss League before recurring migraine headaches forced him to retire. He attempted a brief comeback with the 1992 US hockey team in preparation for the Albertville Olympics, but left competitive hockey for good prior to the Winter Games. He then went to Stanford Business School and is now a general partner in a Boston-area private equity firm, where he lives with his wife and three children.

MacDonald was inducted into the United States Hockey Hall of Fame in 2005.

Career statistics

Regular season and playoffs

International

Awards and honors

References

External links
 United States Hockey Hall of Fame bio
 
 

1966 births
Living people
American sportspeople of Canadian descent
American men's ice hockey left wingers
Calgary Flames draft picks
Harvard Crimson men's ice hockey players
HC Lugano players
Hobey Baker Award winners
Ice hockey people from Oklahoma
Ice hockey people from Pittsburgh
Ice hockey players at the 1988 Winter Olympics
Olympic ice hockey players of the United States
Sportspeople from Tulsa, Oklahoma
Stanford Graduate School of Business alumni
United States Hockey Hall of Fame inductees
University School of Milwaukee alumni
NCAA men's ice hockey national champions
AHCA Division I men's ice hockey All-Americans